Get in High is the first of three studio albums by the German group Xhol Caravan (then known as Soul Caravan), an influential band in the krautrock music movement. The album was recorded and released in 1967. The band's only studio album to feature James Rhodes and Ronnie Swinson on lead vocals, Get in High represents Xhol Caravan’s original intent to be a blues/jazz fusion band, and features covers of such blues and R&B standards as “Shotgun” and “Land of a Thousand Dances.” Even so, the album does feature moments of the krautrock sound that would define the band’s later studio albums and their live sound after Rhodes and Swinson left the band. Originally released on CBS Records in vinyl only, the album has not yet been repackaged for digital release.

Track listing

Personnel
 James Rhodes - vocals
 Ronnie Swinson - vocals
 Tim Belbe - saxophone
 Hansi Fischer - saxophone
 Klaus Briest - bass
 Werner Funk - guitar
 Skip van Wyk - drums

External links
  Get in High at Discogs.com

1967 albums
Albums produced by Horst Lippmann
CBS Records albums
Xhol Caravan albums